Mohamed Sulayman Tubeec, (1941– 11 March  2014) was a Somali singer, songwriter and record producer, called the King of Voice.

Personal life
Tubeec was born in 1941 in the town of Laaleys near Berbera, situated in British Somaliland (now Somalia ). During his teenage years he lived in Berbera, Hargeisa and Burao where he grew up. His father, Sulayman Tubeec, was a blacksmith. Tubeec hailed from the Gaboye Somali clan. His mother, Shaqlan Omar Salim, descended from a Hadhrami family from Hami, Yemen. He was the second oldest of four children, three boys and one girl. In 1959 Tubeec moved to Djibouti with his older brother Jama Tubeec, who was a singer as well, where he also started his career as a singer.

Career
In 1960 Tubeec  returned to Hargeisa where he joined the Walaalaha Hargeisa music band led by Abdullahi Qarshe. Tubeec's art was noted for its emphasis on political justice. He used to sing for the Somali independence during the 1960s with the Walaalaha Hargeisa. After the independence and  Unification of the Somali Republic, Tubeec moved to Mogadishu  with members of Waaberi group. After the start of the somali civil war in the 1990s Tubeec relocated to Djibouti then Kolding  Denmark   where he introduced his latest  album Nasteexo . In April 2013 Tubeec made his last song(Laxan) Melody  "Iisoo dhawaaw" by Hodan Abdirahman ft. Abdifatah Yare. On 11 March 2014 he died in a hospital in Germany. On 16 March  2014, the Federal Government of Somalia held a state funeral in honour of Tubeec. Cabinet ministers, legislators, popular artists and former colleagues all attended the funeral service, where Janaza prayers were read. Tubeec was subsequently laid to rest at General Kaahiye Cemetery in Mogadishu, Somalia.

Discography
Hooyo iyo aabe
Nasteexo
Deeqa
Diiriyoow
Amaanada ilaahay
Gufaaco
Alla maanta ayaanta
Aramidu
Waqti

See also
Maryam Mursal
Mohamed Mooge Liibaan
Ahmed Mooge Liibaan
Abdullahi Qarshe
Music of Somalia

References

2014 deaths
20th-century Somalian male singers
21st-century Somalian male singers
1941 births